The MacArthur Study Bible, first issued in 1997 by current HarperCollins brand W Publishing, is a study Bible edited by evangelical Calvinist preacher John F. MacArthur with introductions and annotations to the 66 books of the Protestant Bible. It also includes charts, maps, study notes, Biblical harmonies, chronologies of Old Testament kings and prophets, and appendices. MacArthur, pastor of Grace Community Church and chancellor of The Master's Seminary, wrote more than half of the 20,000 entries himself in longhand, and reworked many of the others written by Seminary faculty.

Initially only available in the New King James Version, the MacArthur Study Bible is now also published using the New American Standard Bible, English Standard Version, and New International Version translations, as well as in Spanish, German, French, Italian and Portuguese. In 1998, it won the Gold Medallion Book Award for Study Bible of the Year, and as of 2007 had more than one million copies distributed. It has also been criticized for its views on dispensationalist premillennialism in eschatology, and limited atonement.

References

External links
 MacArthur Study Bible in ESV

Study Bibles
1997 books
1997 in Christianity